LJN Toys Ltd. was an American toy company and video game publisher based in New York City. Founded in 1970 by Jack Friedman, the company was acquired by MCA Inc. in 1985, sold to Acclaim Entertainment in 1990, and dissolved in 1994. The toy division of the company was closed by Acclaim and the company shifted towards video game publishing before being closed in 1994. The company's branding was last used for the release of Spirit of Speed 1937 in 2000.

History

Early history (1970–1985)

Jack Friedman founded LJN in 1970 using funds from his employer Norman J. Lewis Associates (from which the company name "LJN" is derived, being a reversal of Lewis' initials) after seeing the sale figures of Mattel and Milton Bradley Company increase. Friedman later founded THQ and Jakks Pacific after leaving LJN. LJN shifted money used for television advertising to instead purchase licenses to make toys based on television shows. The first toyline by LJN based on a television show was for Emergency! The highest amount the company paid for a license by 1982 was $250,000.

LJN purchased the license to make toys based on E.T. the Extra-Terrestrial for $25,000 due to other companies declining the option, including Kenner Products and Ideal Toy Company, and sold over $16–25 million worth of merchandise without the need of an advertising campaign. A doll based on Brooke Shields was released with a $2 million advertising budget and made over $12 million in 1982. LJN's revenue rose from $5 million in 1971, to $70 million in 1982 due to the E.T. and Brooke Shields toys.

In 1984 LJN became the toy licensee of the World Wrestling Federation. The Wrestling Superstars line, which featured action figures based on WWF's roster of wrestlers, was produced from 1984 to 1989.

LJN competed with Mattel in the toy market. The company produced the ThunderCats toyline in competition to Mattel's Masters of the Universe.

MCA ownership (1985–1990)

On March 26, 1985, MCA Inc. announced that it would purchase 63% of LJN's stocks for $39.8 million and proposed to buy the remainder of the stock for $14.26 for each share which would increase the total value of the deal to almost $65 million. However, the company failed to make a net income from 1986 to 1989, and MCA had to take a $53 million after-tax charge due to the expenses of the company before selling it to Acclaim Entertainment for $30 million in April 1990. LJN had a revenue of $110,510,000 and a net loss of $37.3 million in 1987.

LJN entered the video game industry by publishing games based on movies and television shows developed by companies including Atlus, Beam Software, and Rare for the Nintendo Entertainment System in 1987. The company released the LJN Video Art in 1987. The majority of the company's $70 million in sales in 1990 came from video game sales on the Nintendo Entertainment System and Game Boy.

The company released a paint gun line named Gotcha! with a license from the film Gotcha!, but were criticized by consumer protection groups due to the danger it posed to eyes. However, the toyline was financially unsuccessful and MCA had to take a $35 million after-tax charge due to the failure of the toyline and the expenses of the Coleco. The company was also criticized by police officers and Americans for Democratic Action for its Entertech line of toy water guns due to how realistic they looked. LJN changed the design of the toys after three people in the United States from ages 13 to 19 were killed as a result of police officers thinking they had actual guns and multiple cities and states banned the sale of realistic toy guns.

Acclaim Entertainment ownership (1990–2000)

Lawrence Kanga filed a lawsuit on the behalf of Clark Thiemann on January 31, 1990, against LJN, Nintendo, and Major League Baseball claiming that the game Major League Baseball was falsely advertised to Thiemann stating that it would allow him to simulate being a baseball team manager and Kanga stating that the game was advertised as having all of the players, but instead only had their uniform numbers.

Acclaim closed LJN's toy division and shifted the company's focus to video game publishing. In 1991, the U.S. Consumer Product Safety Commission recalled LJN's Sling 'Em- Fling 'Em wrestling ring toys based on the World Wrestling Federation, which sold 1.4 million products from 1985 to 1989, due to multiple children between six and ten being injured by the toys.

Acclaim closed LJN in 1994, but reused the company's name for the release of Spirit of Speed 1937 in 2000.

The LJN brand was revived again in 2021 by Jazwares for its All Elite Wrestling Unmatched line of action figures. The LJN-style figures resemble the Wrestling Superstars of the 1980s.

References

1970 establishments in New York City
1994 disestablishments in New York (state)
Companies based in New York (state)
Defunct toy manufacturers
Defunct video game companies of the United States
Manufacturing companies disestablished in 1990
Manufacturing companies established in 1970
Toy companies of the United States
Video game companies disestablished in 1994
Video game companies established in 1970
Video game companies of the United States